TRON is a decentralized, open-source blockchain-based operating system with smart contract functionality, proof-of-stake principles as its consensus algorithm and a cryptocurrency native to the system, known as  Tronix (TRX). It was established in March 2014 by Justin Sun and since 2017 has been overseen and supervised by the TRON Foundation, a non-profit organization in Singapore, established in the same year. It was originally an Ethereum-based ERC-20 token, which switched its protocol to its own blockchain in 2018. TRC20 has a fee of 5 trones per 1 USDT coin for the transfer.
On some cryptocurrency wallets, you can't withdraw your USDT funds until you have enough money for the network fee.

History 
TRON was founded by Justin Sun in 2017. The TRON Foundation was established in July 2017 in Singapore. The TRON Foundation raised $70 million in 2017 through an initial coin offering shortly before China outlawed the digital tokens. The testnet, Blockchain Explorer, and Web Wallet were all launched by March 2018. TRON Mainnet launched shortly afterward in May 2018, marking the Odyssey 2.0 release as a technical milestone for TRON. In June 2018, TRON switched its protocol from an ERC-20 token on top of Ethereum to an independent peer-to-peer network. On 25 July 2018, the TRON Foundation announced it had finished the acquisition of BitTorrent, a peer-to-peer file sharing service. With this, TRON declared its independence with the creation of the Genesis block, along with July 2018 acquisition of BitTorrent. Upon this acquisition, in August 2018, BitTorrent Founder Bram Cohen also disclosed that he was leaving the company to found Chia, an alternative to bitcoin created to be a less energy-intensive cryptocurrency. 

By January 2019, TRON had a total market cap of about $1.6 billion. Despite this market performance, some authors viewed TRON as a typical case of the complex and disordered nature of cryptocurrencies. In February 2019, after being acquired by Tron Foundation, BitTorrent started its own token sale based on the TRON network.

Architecture 
TRON adopts a 3-layer architecture divided into storage layer, core layer, and application layer. The TRON protocol adheres to Google protocol buffers, which intrinsically supports multi-language extension.

The TRON protocol, maintained primarily by the TRON Foundation, distributes computing resources equally among TRX holders with internal pricing mechanisms such as bandwidth and energy. TRON provides a decentralized virtual machine, which can execute a program using an international network of public nodes. The network has zero transaction fees and conducts approximately 2,000 transactions per second.

The implementations of TRON require minimal transaction fees in order to prevent malicious users from performing DDoS attacks for free. In this respect, EOS.IO and TRON are quite similar, due to the negligible fees, high transactions per second, and high reliability, and as such are regarded as a new generation of blockchain systems. Michael Borkowski, Marten Sigwart, Philipp Frauenthaler, Taneli Hukkinen and Stefan Schulte defined TRON as an Ethereum clone, with no fundamental differences. The transactions per second rate on Tron's blockchain was questioned because it was far below its theoretical claim.

Criticisms 
In January 2018, via a Tweet, Juan Benet, the CEO at Protocol Labs, revealed that the white paper of TRON copied portions of the white papers from IPFSbot and MineFilecoin, without a single reference. Researchers from Digital Asset Research (DAR) discovered multiple instances of code copied from other projects in the Tron code base. It is also accused of violating the GNU Lesser General Public License v3.0 (LGPL) because the project does not mention that its client was derived from EthereumJ, a Java implementation of Ethereum. These accusations were denied by the TRON Foundation, the organization behind the design of the system.

In May 2019, the cyber-security testing service HackerOne revealed that just one computer could have brought TRON's entire blockchain to a halt. The revelation showed that a barrage of requests sent by a single PC could be used to squeeze the power of the blockchain's CPU, overload the memory, and perform a distributed denial-of-service (DDoS) attack.

On 13 June 2022, Tron's algorithmic stablecoin, USDD, lost its peg to the US Dollar, trading at 0.96 per dollar for about a month.

References

External links
 

2017 software
Blockchains
Cross-platform software
Currencies introduced in 2017
Cryptocurrency projects
Alternative currencies